William Lindsay was a Scottish diplomat and colonial governor.  He was the second son of Sir David Lindsay of Evelick, of the Lindsay of Evelix family.  He served as Great Britain's Resident to the Republic of Venice, as well as the Governor of Tobago in 1791.  Like his elder brother John, he predeceased their father, and so David's titles passed to his third son, Charles.

Sources
http://www.perthshireheritage.co.uk/evelick.html

|-

William
Scottish diplomats
Ambassadors of Great Britain to the Republic of Venice
Scottish colonial officials
18th-century Scottish people
Year of death missing
Year of birth missing
Governors of British Tobago